Patricia Dillon is an American Democratic Party politician currently serving as a member of the Connecticut House of Representatives from the 92nd district, which encompasses part of New Haven, since 1985. Dillon has served in the house for  years, making her the longest serving member of the Connecticut House of Representatives. In 2021, Dillon, alongside State Senator Gary Winfield, introduced a bill to make pizza Connecticut's official state food. Dillon currently serves as a member of the House Judiciary Committee, Appropriations Committee, and Environment Committee.

References

Living people
Democratic Party members of the Connecticut House of Representatives
People from New Haven, Connecticut
21st-century American politicians
Year of birth missing (living people)